The Mark Hotel is a luxury hotel, situated at 25 East 77th Street, at Madison Avenue, on the Upper East Side of Manhattan, New York City.   Originally constructed in 1927 in the Renaissance Revival style, the building was purchased by Izak Senbahar of Alexico Group and Simon Elias in 2006 and the building's interiors were reimagined by French designer Jacques Grange in 2009. 

In addition to housing 106 hotel rooms and 47 suites.  the building features a Jean Georges Vongerichten restaurant and bar, a Frédéric Fekkai salon, John Lobb shoe care services, and an exclusive scent by Federick Malle. Jacques Grange commissioned seven international artists and artisans, including Ron Arad, Eric Schmitt, Paul Mathieu, Mattia Bonetti, and Vladamir Kagan to create exclusive furnishings and artwork  for The Mark collection.

In 2015 The Mark Hotel unveiled "The Mark Penthouse" designed by Jacques Grange, on the 16th and 17th floors. At over 10,000 square feet it is the largest hotel suite in the United States. With 5 bedrooms, 8 bathrooms, great room, library, formal dining room, gourmet kitchen and four fireplaces, it affords exclusive access to a 2,500 square foot private terrace overlooking the City Skyline, Central Park and The Metropolitan Museum of Art.  
 
In addition to The Mark Penthouse, Jacques Grange has recently designed The Mark Five Bedroom Terrace Suite and The Mark Three Bedroom Terrace Suite. Both suites are located on the 14th floor of the hotel and feature terraces facing the City Skyline and Central Park.

Awards and recognitions

The Mark Hotel has received the following awards and recognitions.

2020       Travel + Leisure                                              #1 City Hotel in The Continental United States
2020       Travel + Leisure                                              #1 Hotel in New York City 
2019       Condé Nast Traveler                                           2019 Readers' Choice Awards: The Top Hotels in New York City 
2019       Travel + Leisure                                                   The Top 15 Hotels in New York City

2017       Bilanz Magazine                                                  #1 City Hotel in the World
 2017       Elite Traveler Magazine                                      Top 100 Suites in the World
 2015       Conde Nast Traveler                                           Top Hotels in New York
 2015       U.S. News & World Report                                  Best Hotels of 2015
 2015       Condé Nast Traveler                                           Gold List 2015
 2014       Conde Nast Traveler                                           Best Hotels in New York City: Readers' Choice Awards 2014
 2014       Thrillist                                                                 Best Hotels in the Country
 2014       U.S. News & World Report                                    Best New York Hotels
 2014       Fodor's Choice                                                    Fodor's Choice New York City Hotels

References

Hotels established in 1927
Hotel buildings completed in 1927
1927 establishments in New York City
Hotels in Manhattan
Upper East Side